Moed Ahmed (born 11 July 1990) is a Pakistani first-class cricketer who played for Islamabad cricket team.

References

External links
 

1990 births
Living people
Pakistani cricketers
Islamabad cricketers
Cricketers from Islamabad